The BMW B58 is a turbocharged straight-six engine, which began production in 2015. The B58 replaced the N55 and was launched in the F30 340i.

The B58 engine was named to Ward's World's 10 Best Engines 4 times, in 2016 (installed in the 340i), 2017 (M240i), 2019 (X5) and 2020(M340i).

The S58 engine, which was released in early 2019, is the high-performance version of the B58.

Design

The turbocharger is a twin-scroll design, for more efficient power delivery with less turbo lag and more power than a conventional single turbocharger, as well as for weight and space saving benefits. The intercooler - a water-to-air design - is integrated into the intake plenum, to reduce the volume of air between the turbocharger and the cylinders.

As per the N55, the B58 also features direct fuel injection, variable valve timing (called double Vanos by BMW), and variable valve lift (called Valvetronic by BMW).

The B58 also features an engine-mounted heat encapsulation system to reduce engine wear and emissions during start-up.

For durability and longevity, the rotating assembly has a forged steel crankshaft and forged connecting rods.

As a part of BMW's new modular engine family, the crankcase is a completely new design identical to the B57 diesel version, engineered as both a gasoline and diesel engine in one common part. The closed deck crankcase is equipped with a completely new structure which can be identified by a complex array of ribs on the exhaust and intake side and an additional reinforcement frame on the oil pump side.

The engine was revised in 2018, dubbed "B58TU", with notable changes and improvements. The fuel system was updated with 75% increased pressure with updated high pressure fuel pump and injectors, a new particulate filter in the catalytic converter, a new one-part timing chain as opposed to the earlier two-part, and new separate cooling circuits for the cylinder head and crankcase. For weight savings, the crankcase wall thickness and forged crankshaft were optimized, and the exhaust manifold was integrated into the cylinder head housing.

Models

B58B30M0: 240 kW (322 HP) version 
Applications:
2015–2019 F30/F31/F34 340i
2016–2019 F32/F33/F36 440i
2016–2019 G11/G12 740i/Li

B58B30M0: 250 kW (335 HP) version 
Applications:
2016–2019 F20/F21 M140i
2016–2021 F22/F23 M240i

2017–2019 G30/G31 540i
2017–2019 G32 640i

B58B30M0: 265 kW (355 HP) version 
This version was used for 3-/4-Series with the "M Performance Power and Exhaust Kit".

Applications:
 2016–2019 F30/F31/F34 340i
 2016–2019 F32/F33/F36 440i
 2017–2019 G01 X3 M40i
 2018–2019 G02 X4 M40i

B58B30M1: 250 kW (335 HP)
Applications:
 2018–present G05 X5 xDrive40i/sDrive40i
 2018–present G07 X7 xDrive40i
 2018–present G29 Z4 M40i (in countries subject to EU emissions standards)
 2020–present G30/G31 540i
 2020–present G32 640i
 2020–present G06 X6 xDrive40i
 2020–present G11/G12 740i
 2019–present G14/G15/G16 840i
 2019–present Morgan Plus Six
 2022–present Ineos Grenadier

B58B30C: 250 kW (335 HP) 
 2020 Toyota Supra

B58B30O1: 285 kW (382 HP) 
Applications:
 2018–present G29 Z4 M40i (in countries not subject to EU emissions standards)
 2019–present G20 M340i
2019–present G21 M340i
 2020–present G01 X3 M40i
 2019–present G02 X4 M40i
 2020–present G22 M440i
 2021–present Toyota Supra (in countries not subject to EU emissions standards)
 2021–present G42 M240i
 2021–present Boldmen CR4

B58B30M2: 280 kW (380 HP) 
 2022–present G07 X7 xDrive40i
 2023–present G70 740i
 2023–present G05 X5 xDrive50e

S58

The S58 engine is the high-performance version of the B58 engine. It was introduced in the F97 X3 M and F98 X4 M, marking the first time a stand-alone M model was produced for the X3 and X4.

It also features a forged chrome molybdenum heat-treated steel crankshaft, plus forged steel connecting rods and pistons. The pistons are forged by Mahle and feature their proprietary anti-friction coating.

Like the B58, the S58 also features direct fuel injection, variable valve timing (called double Vanos by BMW), and variable valve lift (called Valvetronic by BMW).

As opposed to the B58, the S58 features a slightly smaller displacement, increased bore, decreased stroke, and larger valves. Compression is decreased to 9.3:1 from 11.0:1. The S58 favors top-end power and has a higher redline of 7,200 RPM.

S58B30T0: 338 kW (453 HP) 
 2023–present G87 M2

S58B30T0: 344 kW (461 HP) 

 2019-2022 G20 Alpina B3

S58B30T0: 353 kW (473 HP) 
Applications:
 2019–present F97 X3 M
 2019–present F98 X4 M
 2021–present G80 M3
 2021–present G82 M4

S58B30T0: 364 kW (488 HP) 
 2023-present G20 Alpina B3

S58B30T0: 375 kW (503 HP) 
Applications:
 2019–present F97 X3 M Competition
 2019–present F98 X4 M Competition
 2021–present G80 M3 Competition
 2021–present G82 M4 Competition

References 

BMW engines
Products introduced in 2015
Straight-six engines
Gasoline engines by model